Rock N Roll Grandpa is a 2016 Korean film, directed by Lee Jang-hee.  The film will portray a boy full of dreams who rekindles an old man's passion. It stars Yang Seung-ho, Ha eun-seol, Oh Kwang-rok, and more.

This is the first local movie broadcast featuring multimedia content. the story unfolded in beautiful Gijang and it's a story about life hardships. A chaotic story of a rock band of sweet young adults and old men. it Musical with songs of dreams and love.

Cast 
Yang Seung-ho as Gi Ho-tae
Gi Ho-tae is a bright and confident 20-year-old Kee Ho-tae, who calls himself a 'voluntary applicant for temporary position' and works at a refrigerated warehouse. He has many dreams, and he is voluntarily working at this difficult job to follow his dreams. He meets an old man who lost all his dreams, and they hope to improve their lives, all the while communicating with each other through music.
 Ha eun-seol
Oh Kwang-rok
 Yoon Soo-il
Lee Chae-mi

References 

South Korean drama films
2016 films
2010s South Korean films